Viglacera Corporation is a construction materials company of Vietnam, manufacturing and selling ceramic floor tiles, stone floor tiles, wall tiles, cotto tiles, bricks, float glass, and plumbing fixtures such as sinks and toilets.  The company is headquartered in the Từ Liêm District of Ha Noi and it is listed on the Ho Chi Minh City Stock Exchange.

See also
Tiles
Ceramics
Float glass
Decorative tilework and coloured brick

Subsidiaries
Viglacera has over 30 subsidiary companies, employing over 18,000 people.

References

External links
  Viglacera Corporation official site
  Viglacera Corporation official site, List of subsidiaries
Google finance, Viglacera  Ba Hien JSC
Google finance, Viglacera  Dong Trieu JSC
Google finance, Viglacera  Ha Long JSC
Google finance, Viglacera  Thanglong Ceramic Tiles JSC
Google finance, Viglacera Tu Son JSC

Companies listed on the Hanoi Stock Exchange
Manufacturing companies based in Hanoi
Building materials companies
Vietnamese brands